The Crowley Historic District, in Crowley in Acadia Parish, Louisiana, is a  historic district which was listed on the National Register of Historic Places in 1982.  The listing included 270 contributing buildings.

It was deemed "significant in the area of architecture as the largest, most complete, architecturally pretentious and visually impressive example of a late-nineteenth to early-twentieth century town in a 7 parish area.  These include the parishes of Acadia, Lafayette, Jefferson, Davis, Allen, Evangeline,
St. Landry and Vermilion. It is the only historic town in this region in which the
residential area and the commercial area are both well preserved and impressive."

The  area historic district comprises a total of 266 buildings constructed between 1887 and 1931.

It includes Bungalow/craftsman and Queen Anne architecture.

The district includes the eastern part of downtown Crowley, and is roughly bounded by East 6th Street, North Avenue M, East 2nd Street, South Avenue H, East Ash Street, South Avenue G, East Mill Street and North Avenue F.

It includes one seven-story early skyscraper building, the First National Bank Building (1920) on Parkerson, which stands out from the usual two- to three-story scale of buildings in its area.

References

External links

National Register of Historic Places in Acadia Parish, Louisiana
Historic districts on the National Register of Historic Places in Louisiana
Queen Anne architecture in Louisiana
Buildings and structures completed in 1887